Kum is the highest peak in the Slovenian Sava Hills. The mountain is also called the "Sava Triglav" because it is the highest peak in the region. There are a number of structures at the summit, notably a church dedicated to Saint Agnes from the 17th century and a transmitter. It belongs to the settlement of Ključevica.

See also 
 Mountains of Slovenia

References

External links

Mountains of Lower Carniola
Municipality of Trbovlje
One-thousanders of Slovenia